The Mahnke House is an historical residential building located in Des Moines, Iowa, United States.  The house was built by prolific Des Moines builder Fred W. Weitz in 1909 in the Prairie School style.  The exterior is covered in Flemish bond brick veneer.  It features a hip roof, a single-story west side solarium, a rear porch and a flat-roofed centered front portico with a raised entrance and square paned window lights. George and Emma Mahnke owned the house between 1909 and 1952 when they transferred the property to the Des Moines Annual Conference of the Methodist Church.  The house then became the residence of the organization's superintendents.  It was individually listed on the National Register of Historic Places in 1983, and it was included as a contributing property in the Ingersoll Place Plat Historic District in 2000.

References

Houses completed in 1909
Houses in Des Moines, Iowa
National Register of Historic Places in Des Moines, Iowa
Houses on the National Register of Historic Places in Iowa
Individually listed contributing properties to historic districts on the National Register in Iowa
Prairie School architecture in Iowa